Muthyalanagar is a residential area located in north west Bangalore in the Indian state of Karnataka, bounded by Yeswanthpur, Mathikere and M.S Ramaiah Nagar. A temple dedicated to Muthyalamma Goddess is located here. Projectseem18 a complete, Electrical components, Electronic components, Turningjobs and cable solution for Defence Sector  located in MES Road An  park called the Jayaprakash Narayana Bioversity Park is situated beside the area. It is away from the moribund city life.

References

Neighbourhoods in Bangalore